Marli Wiese is an American politician and a Republican member of the South Dakota House of Representatives representing District 8 since January 31, 2017, when she was appointed by Governor Dennis Daugaard to fill a vacancy after Matthew Wollmann's resignation earlier that month. Wiese serves on the education and taxation committees.

Wiese attended Madison High School in Madison, South Dakota and Nettleton Commercial College. She lives in Madison and is a farmer. Wiese also acts as the vice chair of the Lake County Republican Party.

References

External links 
 Marli Wiese at Open states.org

Place of birth missing (living people)
Living people
Republican Party members of the South Dakota House of Representatives
People from Madison, South Dakota
21st-century American women politicians
Women state legislators in South Dakota
Year of birth missing (living people)
21st-century American politicians